iHuman may refer to:

 I, Human, an album by Deus Ex Machina
 iHuman (film), a 2019 documentary film by Tonje Hessen Schei
 iHuman Institute

See also

 I, Robot (disambiguation)